Cuddeback is a surname. Notable people with the surname include:

 Leon D. Cuddeback (1898–1984), American aviator
 William H. Cuddeback (1852–1919), American lawyer and politician
 Zachary Cuddeback (died 2011), American shooting victim

See also
 Cuddeback Lake